Andrew Taylor (born 14 March 1986) is an English former footballer who played as a defender.

Early life
Born in Blackburn, Lancashire, Taylor attended St Paul's RC Primary and St Bede's RC High School in Blackburn and is a product of Blackburn Rovers Youth Academy. Having represented England at both under-19 and under-20 level. Taylor then turned professional in 2004 and Taylor signed a new three-year deal with Blackburn Rovers in September 2005.

Club career

Blackburn Rovers
Whilst at Blackburn, Taylor has had loan spells at Queens Park Rangers, Blackpool, Crewe Alexandra, Huddersfield Town (from 31 January 2007 to 5 April 2007) and Tranmere Rovers.

Tranmere Rovers
Tranmere decided to make his loan move permanent, signing him on a two and a half-year contract for an undisclosed fee in the January 2008 transfer window. Taylor made 30 league appearances in total for Tranmere during the 2007–08 season, scoring a single goal, a half volley against Crewe on New Year's Day 2008. His only goal of the 2008–09 season came at home to Colchester, he curled in a long range free kick.

Sheffield United
Taylor was transferred to Sheffield United in July 2009 for an undisclosed fee. He made his full debut for The Blades came in the opening game of the season in August 2009; a 0–0 draw with Middlesbrough. After an initial run of games Taylor sustained an injury on Boxing Day 2010 which eventually kept him sidelined for fourteen months. On his return to fitness, he was unable to break back into the side and made only four more appearances for United during the 2011–12 season and was subsequently released by The Blades in May 2012 when his contract expired.

Walsall
After being released by Sheffield United, Taylor signed for Walsall on non-contract terms on 28 August. He played against Queens Park Rangers and had an excellent debut for the Saddlers. After the match, Taylor told the club's official website that he is happy to join Walsall, insisting he wanted to play regularly
. Having made twenty-two appearances for the club, Taylor signed a new 18-month contract at the club.

On 12 October 2013 he scored a memorable free-kick in the sixth minute of injury time in a 1–1 game away to Colchester. The goal proved especially lucrative for a family in the Swedish city of Malmö who won 10.103.752 SEK (approximately £929,793) on the national football betting called Stryktipset.

Blackpool
He was released by Blackpool at the end of the 2017–18 season.

International career
Taylor has represented England at international level being capped by both the England under-19 under-20 teams respectively.

Coaching career
In July 2020, Taylor became a coach at AFC Fylde following his retirement. In September 2022, following the resignation of James Rowe, Taylor was appointed interim manager.

Career statistics

Managerial statistics

References

External links

1986 births
Living people
English footballers
Footballers from Blackburn
Association football defenders
Blackburn Rovers F.C. players
Blackpool F.C. players
Crewe Alexandra F.C. players
Huddersfield Town A.F.C. players
Queens Park Rangers F.C. players
Tranmere Rovers F.C. players
Sheffield United F.C. players
Walsall F.C. players
Oldham Athletic A.F.C. players
AFC Fylde players
English Football League players
National League (English football) players
Association football coaches
AFC Fylde managers
National League (English football) managers